The Cycloramphidae are a family of frogs endemic to southeastern Brazil. This family has seen large changes in its composition. Genera that have at some point been included in the Cycloramphidae are at present placed in the Alsodidae, Hylodidae, Leptodactylidae, and Rhinodermatidae. Of these, the Alsodidae and/or Hylodidae have also been considered as subfamilies of Cycloramphidae (as, respectively, Alsodinae and Hylodinae); the Cycloramphidae, as recognized at present, would be similar to subfamily Cycloramphinae under such system.

Genera
There are 36 species in three genera:
 Cycloramphus Tschudi, 1838
 Thoropa Cope, 1865
 Zachaenus Cope, 1866

The AmphibiaWeb omits Zachaenus from this family, considering its placement within Hyloidea as uncertain.

References

 
Amphibian families
Amphibians of South America
Endemic fauna of Brazil
Taxa named by Charles Lucien Bonaparte